Đorđe Bajić may refer to:

 Đorđe Bajić (footballer) (born 1977), Serbian footballer
 Đorđe Bajić (novelist) (born 1975), Serbian writer, literary and film critic